Go Tigers! is a documentary film created about the Tigers of Massillon, Ohio. It is about the football team, the city, and its rivalry against the Canton McKinley High School Bulldogs. The film follows the team during the 1999 regular season. It features the players (mainly the co-captains), and follows them around the whole school year and tells all their stories.

References

External links
 
 
 
 

2001 films
2001 documentary films
American sports documentary films
High school football films
High school football in Ohio
Massillon Tigers
2000s high school films
Documentary films about American football
Documentary films about high school in the United States
Films set in Ohio
Documentary films about Ohio
2000s English-language films
2000s American films